David Vlok is a South African actor and former athlete who acted in numerous films and is best known for his role as Tim Voster in the South African tele-soap Egoli: Place of Gold.

Filmography

References

External links
 
 David Vlok at Whose Who's portal

1963 births
South African male stage actors
South African male film actors
South African male television actors
Living people